The Bertrand Russell Professorship of Philosophy is the senior professorship in philosophy at the University of Cambridge.
It was established in 1896 and named the Bertrand Russell Professorship of Philosophy in 2010, after a successful fundraising appeal to endow the post. The incumbent Bertrand Russell Professor is Alexander Bird, who succeeded Huw Price in October 2020.

Holders
 James Ward (1896–1925)
 G. E. Moore (1925–1939)
 Ludwig Wittgenstein (1939–1947)
 G. H. von Wright (1948–1951)
 John Wisdom (1952–1968)
 Elizabeth Anscombe (1970–1986)
 D. H. Mellor (1986–1999)
 Simon Blackburn (2001–2011)
 Huw Price (2011–2020)
 Alexander Bird (2020–present)

References

 
Philosophy, Russell, Bertrand
School of Arts and Humanities, University of Cambridge
Philosophy, Russell, Bertrand
Bertrand Russell
1896 establishments in the United Kingdom